WBDK (96.7 FM) is a radio station  broadcasting an adult contemporary format. Licensed to Algoma, Wisconsin, United States, the station serves Brown, Door and Kewaunee counties.  The station is currently owned by Bryan Mazur, through licensee Mazur, LLC.

WOMA
The station went on the air as WOMA on 5 November 1986 on the 96.5 MHz frequency by D & M Broadcasting.  The station struggled for years and was sold in 1989 to Wheeler Broadcasting in Shawano, WI, who slowly introduced country music format by mixing it with its then-oldies format and progressed to make it all-country. Due to the large distance of other Wheeler Broadcasting holdings in relation to WOMA, Wheeler unloaded it to Nicolet Broadcasting in 1992 for $150,000.

Sale and changes
Shortly after the sale, offices were moved to Luxemburg, Wisconsin to be closer to Green Bay, Wisconsin. The format changed to a "soft oldies" (Big Bands/Adult Standards of the 1940s through the 1960s).  The frequency was later changed to 96.7 MHz in order to increase their broadcast range and call sign changed to the current WBDK.

WBDK broadcasts in HD Radio and features a classic country format on its secondary HD2 channel. The HD2 programming is relayed on translator W277BP 103.3 FM, licensed to Sturgeon Bay. W277BP was formerly a translator of religious broadcaster WRVM Suring, Wisconsin.

Nicolet Broadcasting sold WBDK, its translator, and three sister stations to Mazur, LLC effective December 2, 2019 for $1.5 million.

References

External links

BDK
Mainstream adult contemporary radio stations in the United States
Radio stations established in 1986
1986 establishments in Wisconsin